All Roads Lead to Rome (French: Tous les chemins mènent à Rome) is a 1949 French comedy film  directed by Jean Boyer and starring Micheline Presle, Gerard Philippe and Albert Rémy.

It was shot at the Victorine Studios in Nice. The film's sets were designed by the art director Robert Clavel.

The film had admissions of 1,434,128 in France.

Cast
 Micheline Presle as Laura Lee
 Gérard Philipe as Gabriel Pégase
 Marcelle Arnold as Hermine
 Albert Rémy as Edgar
 Marion Delbo as  Mady
 Fernand Rauzéna as Le cambrioleurï		
 Jacques Louvigny as	L'ambassadeur

References

Bibliography
 Hubert-Lacombe, Patricia. Le cinéma français dans la guerre froide: 1946-1956. L'Harmattan, 1996.
 Siehlohr, Ulrike . Heroines Without Heroes: Reconstructing Female and National Identities in European Cinema, 1945-1951. A&C Black, 2000.

External links
 All Roads Lead to Rome at IMDb

1949 films
French comedy films
1949 comedy films
French black-and-white films
Films directed by Jean Boyer
1940s French-language films
Films shot at Victorine Studios
1940s French films